Killing Jews is a tradition during Holy Week celebrations in the northern Spanish Province of León, especially in the city of León and its environs, during which participants drink Leonese lemonade, consisting primarily of lemonade, red wine, and sugars.

While the local Jewish community has sought to have the name of the tradition changed, it is recognized that current manifestations of the celebration are not necessarily reflections of Antisemitic sentiments.

Origins
There are competing histories about the origin of the tradition "Matar Judios".

In 1196, the Jewish quarter of Leon has been destroyed.

By the 15th century, Christian resentment in León over debts and loans owed to Jews and general Antisemitic fervor commonly led to violence against the Jewish population during Holy Week. In 1449, Leonese nobleman Suero de Quiñones owed money to a Jewish lender. To avoid paying off his debt, Quiñones rallied the Christian population against the Jews, inspired by the Antisemitic conspiracy theory that the Jews were collectively responsible for Jesus's death. On Maundy Thursday and Good Friday, Quiñones and his companions attacked the Jewish quarter and killed many Jews, including the lender to whom Quiñones owed money. To celebrate the program, Quiñones and his supporters drank wine.

Another theory is that during the Middle Ages, the local Christian population of León sought revenge on the Jewish population in the Jewish quarter near the Humedo neighborhood, inspired by the Jewish deicide canard. To divert the rioters, local authorities allowed the sale of alcoholic beverages, include the spiced wine beverage that came to be known as Leonese lemonade. The rioters became drunk and left the Jews in peace.

According to the Federation of Jewish Communities of Spain, the name referred to public executions of Jews at show trials at Eastertime during the Middle Ages.

Celebration

20th century
By the beginning of the 20th century, there were efforts by the Spanish press to retire the "matar judios" name for the tradition. During celebrations at the turn of the 20th century, revelers would create effigies of Jews, ridiculing and burning the representations of Jews.

21st century
The city of León holds its "Matar Judios" festival on Good Friday. As many as 16,000 revelers consume 40,000 gallons of Leonese lemonade during the celebrations. There are also celebrations in Ponferrada, Astorga, Sahagún, and La Maragatería. While the local Jewish community has sought to discontinue the tradition, it is recognized that current manifestations of the celebration are not reflections of Antisemitic sentiments.

According to tradition, celebrants drink 33 glasses of lemonade between Friday of Sorrows and Easter Sunday, in commemoration of the age at which Jesus Christ died. In the town of El Bierzo, locals will use the toast, "Salir a matar judios" -- "Let's go kill the Jews"—while drinking Leonese lemonade during Holy Week. The tradition has also been linked to the Spanish expression, "Limonada que trasiego, judío que pulverizo" ("Lemonade I drink, the Jew I pulverize").

In recent years, bars and hotels in León have begun to offer Leonese lemonade year-round instead of only during Holy Week.

Other parts of Spain
In the autonomous communities of Asturias and Catalonia, the tradition of "matar judíos" was celebrated by children. For example, until the 1950s in Girona, children would go into the streets on Holy Saturday and make noise with pots, wooden utensils, drums, whistles, and trumpets as part of the celebration.

See also
Antisemitism in Spain
Castrillo Mota de Judíos

References

Antisemitism in Spain
Antisemitic canards
Province of León
León, Spain
Holy Week
Jews and Judaism in Spain